Water Mill or Watermill, may refer to:

 watermill, a mill that uses hydropower.
 Milldam, which may include a water mill within the dam
 Water wheel, the driving engine of the mill
 List of watermills, listing several water mills called Watermill
 The Watermill (Ruisdael), a 1660 painting by Jacob van Ruisdael
 The Watermill (1958 tune) musical composition by Ronald Binge
 Watermill (ballet), a 1972 ballet by Jerome Robbins
 Watermill Theatre, a repertory theatre in Bagnor, Newbury, Berkshire, England, UK
 Water Mill, New York, USA; a hamlet on Long Island in Suffolk County
 Water Mill (LIRR station) of the Long Island Rail Road, in the hamlet of Water Mill
 Water Mill (Water Mill, New York), a watermill listed on the National Register of Historic Places
 The Watermill Center, a center for arts and the humanities
 Watermill Cove, St. Mary's, Isles of Scilly

See also
 Waterwheel (disambiguation)
 Windmill (disambiguation)
 Mill (disambiguation)